Nowruzlu may refer to:
 Nowruzlu, Miandoab
 Nowruzlu, Shahin Dezh